Atira (Pawnee atíra ), literally "our mother" or "Mother (vocative)" is the title of the earth goddess (among others) in the Native American Pawnee tribal culture.

She was the wife of Tirawa, the creator god. Her earthly manifestation is corn, which symbolizes the life that Mother Earth gives.

The goddess was revered in a ceremony called Hako. The ceremony used an ear of corn (maize) painted blue to represent the sky and white feathers attached to represent a cloud as a symbol of Atira.

Her daughter was Uti Hiata who taught the Pawnee people how to make tools and grow food.

Legacy 
 163693 Atira, the first asteroid known to have an orbit entirely within that of Earth, is named for Atira.
 Atira Mons, a mountain on Venus, is named for Atira.
 Atira is included among the women listed in the Heritage Floor of Judy Chicago's The Dinner Party.

References 

Earth goddesses
Goddesses of the indigenous peoples of North America
Pawnee